Pierre Guité (born April 17, 1952) is a Canadian former professional ice hockey player who played 377 games in the World Hockey Association.  He played for the Quebec Nordiques, Michigan Stags, Baltimore Blades, Cincinnati Stingers and Edmonton Oilers. He was traded from the Nordiques to the financially troubled Stags, along with Michel Rouleau and Alain Caron, for Marc Tardif (who became the all-time leading goal scorer in the WHA), just weeks before the Stags folded and the league took over the team, moving it to Baltimore.

As a youth, Guité played in the 1964 Quebec International Pee-Wee Hockey Tournament with a minor ice hockey team from Ville-Émard.

His son, Ben Guité, played in the National Hockey League.

References

External links

1952 births
Ice hockey people from Montreal
Baltimore Blades players
Canadian ice hockey left wingers
Cincinnati Stingers players
Detroit Red Wings draft picks
Edmonton Oilers (WHA) players
Living people
Michigan Stags players
Quebec Nordiques (WHA) players
Penn Quakers men's ice hockey players